Cardinal Mooney Catholic High School is a private, Catholic high school in Marine City, Michigan.  It is located in the Roman Catholic Archdiocese of Detroit.

History
The school is named for Edward Mooney, the first Archbishop of Detroit elevated to the College of Cardinals.

Cardinal Mooney Catholic High School was founded in 1977 at St. Peter's Parish in Mount Clemens, Michigan. In 1983, it moved to a former public school in Harrison Township, Michigan. The school moved to its present location in 1990, and an addition was added in 2009.

Academics
Cardinal Mooney has been accredited by Cognia (or its predecessors) since 1995.

References

External links

Roman Catholic Archdiocese of Detroit
Catholic secondary schools in Michigan
Schools in St. Clair County, Michigan
1977 establishments in Michigan